is a Japanese actress and singer. She writes and produces most of her own music, and plays the piano and other instruments. After being signed to JVC Victor in 1982, Mari first became known for her voice-acting role as Lynn Minmay in the anime Macross. Her debut original album, Rosé, was released in 1983, which was produced by composer Ryuichi Sakamoto. She lives in Los Angeles, California.

Biography

Iijima was born in Tsuchiura, Ibaraki. Her original demo tape was picked up by JVC Victor in 1982 and she was signed to the record company as a singer-songwriter. Soon afterward, she was asked to audition for the role of Lynn Minmay in The Super Dimension Fortress Macross by the label and the producers chose her to play the role. The series quickly became a mega hit and brought Iijima to stardom. Her debut album, Rosé, containing no Macross tracks, had lyrics and music written by her. It debuted at number 10 on the charts in September 1983, and she started her career as a singer-songwriter.

Iijima moved to Los Angeles in 1989 to expand her music career. That same year, she appeared as a guest vocalist on Van Dyke Parks' album Tokyo Rose. After releasing her first independent (and first English language) album, No Limit, she was nominated for the 2000 Los Angeles Music Awards' Best Pop Artist for the album and she was in the final four for the award.

She won the best Asian song for her track Unspoken Love from the album Wonderful People at the Just Plain Folks Awards in 2006 and performed as a guest performer.

In 2006, she reprised her role as Lynn Minmay in ADV Films' English-language release of Macross, which made her the second Japanese voice actor to reprise her role in an English anime dub (following only Miyuki Sawashiro).
Iijima released her twenty-first studio album, called Echo, in August 2009. The title was taken from the nymph character Echo that appears in Echo and Narcissus. The album's theme is unrequited love.

She has continued to perform into the 2020s, both live and in videos, but a Tokyo concert planned for August 2020 was postponed to January 11, 2021 (then to August 28, 2021), due to the CoVid-19 crisis.  Iijima stated on her website that she "likes the ring of '1.11'" as a sign for the future.

Discography

Original albums

Compilation albums

EPs

Singles

Soundtracks

Filmography

Video games

References

External links

 Official blog 
 
  (Victor Entertainment)
 
 
 
 

1963 births
Living people
Anime singers
Japanese emigrants to the United States
Japanese women pop singers
Japanese women singer-songwriters
Japanese radio personalities
Japanese television actresses
Japanese video game actresses
Japanese voice actresses
Japanese women record producers
Musicians from Ibaraki Prefecture
People from Tsuchiura
Victor Entertainment artists
Voice actresses from Ibaraki Prefecture
Warner Music Japan artists
20th-century Japanese actresses
20th-century Japanese women singers
20th-century Japanese singers
21st-century Japanese actresses
21st-century Japanese women singers
21st-century Japanese singers